Edmonton Boosters was a Canadian football team in the Alberta Rugby Football Union. The team played three seasons between 1930 and 1932 seasons.

ARFU season-by-season

References

CFLdb - Edmonton - 1930

Defunct Canadian football teams
Boo
1930 establishments in Alberta
Sports clubs established in 1930
Sports clubs disestablished in 1932
1932 disestablishments in Alberta